Arab Tunisian Bank (ATB), a Tunisian commercial bank, was created on June 30, 1982, by the integration of a branch of the Arab Bank Tunis with Tunisian individuals. Its mission was contribution to the economic and financial development of the country.

History
Tunisia's first President, Habib Bourguiba, was helped by Abdul Hameed Shoman, the founder of the Arab Bank Group in his combat against French colonization.  In 1952, Bourguiba permitted Shoman to open an Arab bank branch in Tunisia, as Arab Bank-Tunis. In 1982, Arab Bank changed to Arab Tunisian Bank.

In 2008, the General Assembly decided to grow the bank capital from 60 million dinars to 100 million dinars within two years. They have increased the capital of the bank to 80 million in 2008 as a first step.

Today, ATB has a network of 103 branches and 12 subsidiaries.

See also
List of banks
List of banks in Tunisia

References

External links 
 

1982 establishments in Tunisia
Banks established in 1982
Banks of Tunisia
Companies listed on the Bourse de Tunis